Koanophyllon panamense is a species of flowering plant in the family Asteraceae. It is found only in Panama. It is threatened by habitat loss.

References

External links
photo of herbarium specimen at Missouri Botanical Garden, collected in Panamá in 1939

panamense
Flora of Panama
Endangered plants
Plants described in 1974